To Matthieu is a 2000 French drama film written and directed by Xavier Beauvois and starring Nathalie Baye.

The film was entered into the main competition at the 57th Venice International Film Festival.

Plot

Cast 
 Benoît Magimel as Matthieu
 Nathalie Baye as Claire 
 Antoine Chappey as Eric 
 Fred Ulysse as Francis
 Jean-Marie Winling as The Factory's Owner 
 Françoise Bette as Simone
 Mélanie Leray as Dominique
 Virginie Dessèvre as Virginie

References

External links

French drama films
2000 drama films
2000 films
Films directed by Xavier Beauvois
2000s French films